George Dzundza (born July 19, 1945) is an American television and film actor.

Early life and education
Dzundza was born in Rosenheim, Germany, to a Ukrainian father, Roman Dzundza, originally from Kalush, Ukraine, and a Polish mother, Maria Humenecka, originally from Lviv, Ukraine. His parents were forced into factory labour by the Nazis. He spent the first few years of his life in displaced persons camps with his parents and one brother.

The family moved to Amsterdam in 1949, then moved to the US in 1956, settling in the Lower East Side of Manhattan in New York City. He attended Xavier High School in Manhattan. He attended St. Johns University and also studied under Stella Adler and Harold Clurman.

Career

Dzundza began acting in his freshman year of college at the insistence of another student. However, his professional stage debut was in a 1973 New York Shakespeare Festival production of King Lear.

Dzundza starred in a short-lived 1981 sitcom series Open All Night, about the owner of a "Store 364" convenience store in Inglewood, California. He portrayed American Nazi leader Frank Collin in the 1981 made-for-television movie Skokie.

In 1987, Dzundza played Sam Hesselman, a disabled man in a wheelchair, in No Way Out and Commander Daskal in The Beast.  Other major film roles of his include The Deer Hunter, White Hunter Black Heart, Streamers, Basic Instinct, Crimson Tide, and Dangerous Minds. 

He was an original cast member of the long-running NBC drama Law & Order, playing NYPD Sergeant Max Greevey in the first season only. He was disappointed when he realized that Law & Order would be more of an ensemble show rather than a show starring him. Though his castmates liked his portrayal of Greevey, they increasingly felt uncomfortable around Dzundza, who was also under stress from the commute between New York City and his home in Los Angeles. Dzundza quit after the first season of the show, making his last full appearance in the season finale, "The Blue Wall". His character (portrayed by an extra with his back to the camera) was murdered in the second season premiere episode, "Confession".

His other acting work includes an appearance on The Waltons (1975), playing the Archie Bunker-like father in the short-lived Christina Applegate sitcom Jesse, and voicing supervillain the Ventriloquist in Batman: The Animated Series and Perry White in Superman: The Animated Series, as well as numerous minor roles such as G. Carl Francis and Dr. Gregory Belson, within both shows. His Broadway theatre credits include Terrence McNally's The Ritz.

In 2005, he played Anubis (aka "Jim") in the Stargate SG-1 Season 8 episode "Threads". Dzundza portrayed George O'Malley's father Harold on Grey's Anatomy.

Personal life
Dzundza has been married since 1982 to Mary Jo Vermeulen. They have three daughters as well as two grandchildren.

He is a naturalized US citizen.

Filmography

Film

Television

References

External links

1945 births
Living people
American male film actors
American male television actors
American male voice actors
German emigrants to the United States
People from Rosenheim
Male actors from Bavaria
Naturalized citizens of the United States
Volpi Cup for Best Actor winners
American people of Polish descent
American people of Ukrainian descent
20th-century American male actors
21st-century American male actors
St. John's University (New York City) alumni